Bidorpitia biforis is a species of moth of the family Tortricidae. It is found in Cotopaxi Province, Ecuador.

The wingspan is about 15 mm. The ground colour of the forewings is cream ferruginous, with more rust coloured suffusions and strigulations (fine streaks). The markings are brownish rust. The hindwings are cream, mixed with orange in the apical part.

Etymology
The species name refers to the shape of the arm of the gnathos and is derived from Latin biforis (meaning bilobed).

References

Moths described in 2008
Euliini
Moths of South America
Taxa named by Józef Razowski